Rami Glam (born September 23, 1978) is a former Israeli footballer.

Rami's older brother is Moshe Glam.

Honours
Israeli Youth Championship (1):
1994-95
Second Division (1):
1998-99
Third Division (1):
2006-07

References

External links
Stats at One
 

1978 births
Living people
Israeli Jews
Israeli footballers
Maccabi Netanya F.C. players
Hapoel Kfar Saba F.C. players
Hapoel Rishon LeZion F.C. players
Hapoel Beit She'an F.C. players
Beitar Tel Aviv Bat Yam F.C. players
Hakoah Maccabi Amidar Ramat Gan F.C. players
Hapoel Ramat Gan F.C. players
Footballers from Netanya
Liga Leumit players
Israeli Premier League players
Israeli people of Libyan-Jewish descent
Association football defenders